Robin Donovan (born 19 December 1955 in Rustington, West Sussex) is a British former racing driver. He is best known for competing in 14 editions of the Le Mans 24 hours race; his best result there being 6th overall, 3rd in class (LMP1) and 1st privateer home driving with 5 x Le Mans winner Derek Bell MBE and Daytona 24 hours winner Jurgen Lassig in 1994 with the Gulf Racing entered and sponsored Kremer Porsche K8.

Career
After a prominent Formula Ford single seater career Donovan first began to establish his name as a sports car driver in the British Thundersports series where he won 5 (class C) rounds of the 8 round series in 1985 driving with Mike O Brien. At the end of 1985 he competed in his first World Endurance Championship race in Selangor Malaysia where he came 5th (C2). He again was Thundersports (class c) series winner in 1986 (the year of his first Le Mans 24 hours) and again in 1987 (class B). In 1988 he drove in Thundersaloons and moved up into the British Touring car Championship in 1989, the year he also competed in the BRDC Sportscar Championship. In 1991 he won the Willhire 24 hours (class A). In 1992 and 1993 he drove for the Star Union team  in Interserie European Sportscar Championship and for Kremer Racing in the Le Mans 24 hours. In 1993 he again secured a 3rd place class finish at Le Mans driving for the Augusta Racing GT2 team.
 
During his international racing career Robin Donovan competed in rounds of the World Sports-Prototype Championship, the World Sportscar Championship, the BPR Global GT Series and the International Sports Racing Series. In 1998, with only one race win but a series of podiums, he led the International Sports Racing Series (CN class) throughout the season until the final round at Kyalami where he eventually finished equal vice Champion. After 1998 he continued to compete at Le Mans and in the ISCS (the international touring car endurance series) taking class podiums at Vallelunga (2), Barcelona and the Nurburgring 24hrs.
 
Robin Donovan is currently director of Dettaglio, a motorsport events and supercar tours company.

Complete 24 Hours of Le Mans results

Results
2004 & 2006 Vallelunga 6 hrs. BMW M3 24hr 2nd in class
2001 Le Mans 24hrs. Racing Engineering / FAT Turbo Porsche 911 GT3 RS
2000 International Touring Cars (ISCS) GTS BMW M3. 2nd in class Nurburgring 24hrs. Ist in class, 2nd Overall Barcelona.
1999 Le Mans 24hrs with Auto Exe / AM PM Japan Riley & Scott LMP1
1998 Le Mans 24hrs with Larbre Competition / PlayStation Porsche 911 GT3 RS. FIA International Sports Racing Series. Elf Team Centenari Alfa Romeo 3.0, 3 Podiums. 1 class win, Paul Ricard.
1997 Elf Team Centenari. One class win / 2nd overall, Jarama.
1996 Le Mans 24hrs with Ennea Team Ferrari. Ferrari F40 GT1
1995 Le Mans 24hrs with Augusta Racing. Corvette 6.0 Chevrolet. 3rd in class. 11th overall. Global Endurance GT Championship with Augusta Racing. Corvette 6.0 Chevrolet.
1994 Le Mans 24hrs with Gulf Racing (sharing with Derek Bell) Gulf Kremer Porsche LMP1. Front row start. 1st privateer. 3rd in class. 6th overall. Dunlop Rover Turbo Cup Championship. Blue Hawk Racing. Rover Turbo 2.0
1993 Le Mans 24hrs with Kremer Racing. Porsche 962 Group C1 Interserie European Sportscar Championship. JB Racing. Lola Buick 3.3 Indy Car
1992 Le Mans 24hrs with Kremer Racing. Porsche 962 Group C1. 4th in class. 11th overall. Interserie European Sportscar Championship. Star Union. Gunnar Porsche 966 Spyder
1991 Interserie European Sportscar Championship. Gunnar Porsche 962/966. Winner class A Willhire 24hrs, Esso Superlube Saloon Car Championship. Winner overall Independence Day Trophy Meeting. Lime Rock. IMSA GTP class.  Gunnar Racing Porsche 962/966. Le Mans 24hrs with Chamberlain Engineering / Financial Times Spice Cosworth C2
1990 Le Mans 24hrs with Chamberlain Engineering /Dianetique Spice Cosworth. Led C2 class
1989 Le Mans 24hrs with factory entered Tiga Cosworth Group C2. British Touring Car Championship with Blue Hawk Racing. Sierra Cosworth  3.0. British C2 Sportscar Championship with JB Racing Harrier 5.0 Chevrolet
1988 Le Mans 24hrs with Team Lucky Strike. Argo Cosworth 3.3 Group C2. 5th in class. British Thundersaloons Championship. Blue Hawk Racing. Honda Legend 7.0 Chevrolet, one podium, Brands Hatch.
1987 Le Mans 24hrs and World Sportscar Championship with JB Racing / Penthouse Bardon Cosworth Group C2. British Thundersports Championship with Blue Hawk Racing Harrier 3.9 Cosworth. 3 podiums. 3 class wins (B series winner).
1986 Le Mans 24hrs and World Sportcar Championship with JB Racing / Goodmans Sound Bardon Cosworth Group C2. British Thundersports Championship with Blue Hawk Racing Shrike Ford P15. 5 podiums. 2 class wins (C series winner).
1985 British Thundersports Championship with Blue Hawk Racing Shrike Ford P15. 5 podiums. 5 class wins (C series winner).
1979-83 Front runner in Dunlop Star of Tomorrow, P&O & Champion of Brands FF Championships.

References

1955 births
Living people
British racing drivers
24 Hours of Le Mans drivers
British Formula Three Championship drivers
World Sportscar Championship drivers
Racing Engineering drivers
Larbre Compétition drivers